Thandavapalle is a village in Amalapuram Mandal, Dr. B.R. Ambedkar Konaseema district in the state of Andhra Pradesh in India.

Geography 

Demographics 
 India census, Thandavapalle had a population of 1959, out of which 985 were male and 974 were female. The population of children below 6 years of age was 10%. The literacy rate of the village was 81%.

References 

Villages in Amalapuram Mandal